Mulwal is a village in the Punjab province of Pakistan. It is located at 33°1'40N 72°32'11E with an altitude of 374 metres (1230 feet).

References

Villages in Punjab, Pakistan